The 2013 New Jersey gubernatorial election took place on November 5, 2013, to elect the governor of New Jersey. Incumbent Republican Governor Chris Christie ran for re-election to a second term in office. He faced Democratic nominee Barbara Buono and six others in the general election. Christie was re-elected with over 60 percent of the vote and carried 19 of the state's 21 counties, with Buono only winning heavily Democratic Hudson and Essex. Christie became the first Republican gubernatorial candidate to win a majority of the vote since Thomas Kean's landslide victory in 1985.  

This is the only statewide election held in New Jersey since the 1988 presidential election in which a Republican earned more than 48% of the vote. Christie won 21% of Black voters and 51% of Latinos. , this was the last time a Republican won the governorship of New Jersey or won any statewide election. This is also the last time the counties of Bergen, Burlington, Camden, Middlesex, Mercer, Passaic, and Union voted for the Republican candidate in a statewide election, as well as the last time that Somerset did so in a gubernatorial election. 

Christie was criticized for spending an additional $12–25 million of state money to hold a special election for United States Senator for New Jersey three weeks earlier on October 16, instead of simply holding the special election on November 5, concurrent with the already scheduled gubernatorial election. The Democratic nominee for the U.S. Senate was Newark mayor Cory Booker. Buono said it was hypocritical, speculating that Booker's presence on the ballot would attract more black and other minority voters who would be likely to vote for Buono.

This is the only gubernatorial election since 1989 in which anyone won over 60% of the vote, and Christie was the first Republican to do so since 1985.

Republican primary

Candidates

Declared
 Chris Christie, incumbent governor
 Seth Grossman, former Atlantic City Councilman

Results

Democratic primary

Candidates

Declared
 Barbara Buono, state senator and former state senate majority leader
 Troy Webster, aide to East Orange mayor Robert Bowser

Removed from primary ballot
 William Araujo, former mayoral candidate in Edison
 Carl Bergmanson, former mayor of Glen Ridge and candidate for governor in 2009
 Jeff Boss, conspiracy theorist and perennial candidate

Araujo, Bergmanson, Boss, and Webster had their nominating petitions challenged by the New Jersey Democratic State Committee; only Webster's petitions were found to be valid therefore allowing his name to remain on the primary ballot with Buono. Araujo and Boss subsequently filed new petitions to run in the general election as independents.

Declined
 Rob Andrews, U.S. Representative
 Chris Bollwage, Mayor of Elizabeth
 Cory Booker, Mayor of Newark (ran for and won a U.S. Senate seat three weeks earlier on October 16)
 Richard Codey, state senator, former state senate president and former governor
 Joseph Cryan, former assembly majority leader
 Brendan Gill, Essex County Freeholder
 Louis Greenwald, Assembly Majority Leader
 Lisa P. Jackson, former Administrator of the United States Environmental Protection Agency
 Phil Murphy, U.S. Ambassador to Germany, former Goldman Sachs executive, and future Governor of New Jersey
 Sheila Oliver, Speaker of the State Assembly
 Frank Pallone, U.S. Representative
 Bill Pascrell, U.S. Representative
 Stephen Sweeney, State Senate President
 John Wisniewski, chair of the New Jersey Democratic Party and State Assemblyman

Polling

Results

General election

Major party candidates
Chris Christie (Republican), incumbent governor
Running mate: Kim Guadagno, incumbent lieutenant governor
Barbara Buono (Democratic), former majority leader of the New Jersey Senate
Running mate: Milly Silva, New Jersey executive vice president for 1199 SEIU

Minor candidates
 William Araujo, Peace and Freedom
 Running mate: Maria Salamanca
 Jeff Boss, NSA
 Running mate: Robert B. Thorne
 Kenneth R. Kaplan, New Jersey Libertarian Party
 Running mate: Brenda Bell
 Diane W. Sare, Glass-Steagall Now
 Running mate: Bruce Todd
 Hank Schroeder, Independent
 Running mate: Patricia Moschella
 Steve Welzer, Green Party of New Jersey
 Running mate: Patricia Alessandrini

Endorsements

Debates
 Complete video of debate, October 8, 2013 - C-SPAN
 Complete video of debate, October 15, 2013 - C-SPAN

Predictions

Polling

with Booker

with Byrne

with Codey

with Greenwald

with Pallone

with Springsteen

with Sweeney

with Wisniewski

Results

County results

Counties that flipped from Democratic to Republican
Bergen (largest municipality: Hackensack)
Cumberland (largest municipality: Vineland)
Camden (largest municipality: Cherry Hill)
Mercer (largest municipality: Hamilton Township)
Passaic (largest municipality: Paterson)
Union (largest municipality: Elizabeth)

Results by congressional district
Christe won 10 of the 12 congressional districts, including four that elected Democrats. Although he won the 9th district by a very narrow margin.

See also

 2009 New Jersey gubernatorial election
 Governors of New Jersey
 2013 United States gubernatorial elections
 Fort Lee lane closure scandal

References

External links
 Interesting facts about Jersey gubernatorial election
 Barbara Buono for Governor
 Chris Christie for Governor incumbent
 Seth Grossman for Governor
 Troy Webster for Governor
 Kenneth Kaplan for Governor

New Jersey
New Jersey
Gubernatorial
2013
Chris Christie